Black Alice is a novel by American writers Thomas M. Disch and John Sladek (writing as Thom Demijohn), published in 1968.

Plot summary
During the 1960s, in Virginia, while the blacks fight for their civil rights, a young white girl is kidnapped in Baltimore. Little Alice Raleigh, eleven years and blonde like corn, and heiress of an immense fortune, is held for a ransom of a million dollars. Her kidnappers, trying to make her invisible to the police officers and the federal agents searching for her, manage to brown her skin and her hair. They sequester her under an assumed name in a house held by an old black woman, near Norfolk, which turns out to be a house of prostitution.

Slowly, Alice adapts herself to this surprising life amidst the black culture of the time period, completely new for her; at no point in the book is the young Alice made to participate in prostitution, and in fact Alice only has a vague idea of what goes on in behind closed doors in the house.

She eventually discovers that her father is the real instigator of her kidnapping, in essence intending to embezzle money from himself that he can then spend without being traced by government offices.  In the end, Alice is freed and returns to her former life, after denying knowledge of her father while still disguised as a black child and seeing him punished for his misdeed.

References

1968 American novels
1968 fantasy novels
American horror novels
Novels by Thomas M. Disch
Novels set in Virginia
Doubleday (publisher) books